South Carolina Highway 72 (SC 72) is a  state highway, traversing interior portions of the South Carolina Piedmont region. This route is part of a multi two-state route 72 that begins at Athens, Georgia and ends at Rock Hill, South Carolina. The route connects many smaller communities outside major metropolitan areas and is roughly parallel with Interstate 85 (I-85) to the north and I-20 and I-77 to the south and east. The route shares the longest concurrency in the state with SC 121, from Whitmire to Rock Hill.

Route description

The route travels across the state in a southwest to northeast direction, and is sometimes referenced as an unofficial border between the Midlands and the Upstate regions.  Beginning at the Georgia state line on a bridge over Lake Russell (where it is the continuation of SR 72)  SC 72 goes through the town of Calhoun Falls and goes through rural areas of Abbeville County before skirting the county seat of Abbeville on a bypass route.  The route serves as the major thoroughfare for traffic between Abbeville and Greenwood, where it bypasses the downtown area to the north.

Leaving Greenwood, the route heads towards Clinton where it intersects with I-26.  Passing the interstate, the route enters into the Sumter National Forest and passes through the small town of Whitmire.  From Whitmire until just shy of its eastern terminus, SC 72 is cosigned with SC 121.  The route exits the Sumter National Forest and bypasses Chester to the south.  Once past Chester, the route turns more towards the north as it enters Rock Hill, where it terminates at SC 122 in the downtown area.

History
SC 72 had two previous stents in the state before settling in its current role.  The first SC 72 was established in 1925 or 1926 as a new primary routing, from SC 7 at the Saluda River, north to SC 10 in Waterloo. In 1932, this routing became part of U.S. Route 221 (US 221).

The second SC 72 appeared in 1940 as a new primary routing from SC 7, near the Broad River, to Leeds.  In 1942, it was renumbered as SC 722; though was later downgraded in 1948 to secondary Leeds Road (S-12-25).

The third, and current, SC 72 was established in 1942 as a renumbering of SC 7; it traversed from the Georgia state line, near Calhoun Falls, to US 21 in Chester.  In 1950, it was extended northeast to US 21/SC 5 in Rock Hill, which replaced part of US 21.  In 1951 or 1952, its routing was adjusted west of Greenwood replacing  SC 702 and leaving Old Abbeville Highway (S-1-3 and S-24-1).

In 1954, SC 72 was placed on bypass south and east around Chester; its old alignment became a business route.  Also same year, SC 72 was moved south of Abbeville leaving behind Vienna Street (S-1-1) and Cambridge Street/Old Abbeville Highway (S-1-133).  In 1961, SC 72 was placed on new bypass north around Greenwood; its old alignment became a business route.  Sometime between 1990 and 1996, SC 72 was placed on a bypass south and east around Clinton; its old alignment became a business route.  In 2013, SC 72's eastern terminus was adjusted to end at the western terminus of SC 122 on Johnston Street; part of a major removal of highways through downtown Rock Hill.

South Carolina Highway 7

Whitmire alternate route

South Carolina Highway 7 Alternate (SC 7 Alt.) was a short alternate route of the original SC 7 (which became SC 72). In 1940, it was established from U.S. Route 176 (US 176) and SC 7 (now SC 72/SC 121) northeast of Whitmire. In 1942, it was decommissioned and redesignated as SC 72 Alt.

Major intersections

Special routes

Greenwood business loop

South Carolina Highway 72 Business (SC 72 Bus.) is a  business route that is partially in the city limits of Greenwood. It follows the original path of the SC 72 mainline through downtown Greenwood, via Cambridge Avenue, Grace Street, and Reynolds Avenue. It was established in 1961 when mainline SC 72 was bypassed north of the city.

Clinton business loop

South Carolina Highway 72 Business (SC 72 Bus.) is a  business route entirely within the city limits of Clinton. It follows the original path of the SC 72 mainline route that used to traverse through downtown Clinton, via Broad Street and Willard Road. The highway passes by the main entrance of Presbyterian College. It also shares a concurrency with SC 56 Bus. for the majority of its path.

Whitmire alternate route

South Carolina Highway 72 Alternate (SC 72 Alt.) was an alternate route that was a renumbering of SC 7 Alt. northeast of Whitmire. It was established in 1942 from U.S. Route 176 to SC 72. In 1947, it was decommissioned and redesignated as SC 72 Connector (SC 72 Conn.).

Whitmire connector route

South Carolina Highway 72 Connector (SC 72 Conn.) is a connector route of SC 72 that exists northeast of Whitmire. It serves to connect U.S. Route 176 (US 176) with SC 72/SC 121. It is unnamed and is an unsigned highway.

Chester business loop

South Carolina Highway 72 Business (SC 72 Bus.) was established in 1954 when mainline SC 72 was bypassed to the south and east of Chester. It followed the original mainline route through downtown Chester, via West End Street, Main Street, and Saluda Street/Road. In 1964, SC 121 Bus. was established and completely overlapped SC 72 Bus. It is unknown when the business loop was decommissioned.

Rock Hill business spur

South Carolina Highway 72 Business (SC 72 Bus.) was established in 1950 as a business spur into downtown Rock Hill, via Saluda Street, from mainline SC 72, which continued east to terminate at US 21/SC 5 (Anderson Road). Though never originally part of mainline SC 72, it was eventually replaced by the mainline at an unknown date.

See also

References

External links

 
 Mapmikey's South Carolina Highways Page: SC 72
 Mapmikey's South Carolina Highways Page: Former SC 72 Alternate
 Mapmikey's South Carolina Highways Page: SC 72 Business
 Mapmikey's South Carolina Highways Page: SC 7
 Mapmikey's South Carolina Highways Page: Former SC 7 Alternate

072
Transportation in Abbeville County, South Carolina
Transportation in Greenwood County, South Carolina
Transportation in Laurens County, South Carolina
Transportation in Chester County, South Carolina
Transportation in York County, South Carolina